French(-)Japanese or Japanese(-)French may refer to:
France-Japan relations (c.f. "a French-Japanese treaty")
French language education in Japan (c.f. "a French Japanese class")
Japanese language education in France
People with multiple citizenship of France and Japan
Eurasian (mixed ancestry) people of French and Japanese descent in any country

See also
French people in Japan
Japanese people in France